Reginelson Aparecido Paulino Quaresma or simply Milá (born 21 May 1977 in Taquarituba) is a former Brazilian football player.

Milá played for F.C. Penafiel in the 2003–04 Segunda Liga.

External links
ZeroZero profile

References

1977 births
Living people
Brazilian footballers
Joinville Esporte Clube players
FC Elista players
Brazilian expatriate footballers
Expatriate footballers in Russia
Russian Premier League players
Associação Atlética Internacional (Limeira) players
Oeste Futebol Clube players
F.C. Penafiel players
Expatriate footballers in Portugal
Sertãozinho Futebol Clube players
Esporte Clube São Bento players
Esporte Clube XV de Novembro (Piracicaba) players
Barretos Esporte Clube players
Atlético Monte Azul players
Associação Atlética Portuguesa (Santos) players
Capivariano Futebol Clube players

Association football midfielders
Elosport Capão Bonito players